In economics, a necessity good or a necessary good is a type of normal good. 
Necessity goods are product(s) and services that consumers will buy regardless of the changes in their income levels, therefore making these products less sensitive to income change. Examples include repetitive purchases of different durations such as haircuts, addictive habits including tobacco, everyday essentials such as electricity and water, and critical medicine such as insulin.  As for any other normal good, an income rise will lead to a rise in demand, but the increase for a necessity good is less than proportional to the rise in income, so the proportion of expenditure on these goods falls as income rises. If income elasticity of demand is lower than unity, it is a necessity good. This observation for food, known as Engel's law, states that as income rises, the proportion of income spent on food falls, even if absolute expenditure on food rises. This makes the income elasticity of demand for food between zero and one.

Some necessity goods are produced by a public utility. According to Investopedia, stocks of private companies producing necessity goods are known as defensive stocks. Defensive stocks are stocks that provide a constant dividend and stable earnings regardless of the state of the overall stock market.

See also
Basic needs
Income elasticity of demand
Wealth (economics)

References

Goods (economics)